Mount Barker is a mountain in the Mount Lofty Ranges in South Australia and namesake of the nearby town of Mount Barker.

The mountain is the home to a transmission tower that services SAGRN and mobile phone transmissions throughout the area. Microwave radio equipment is also installed on the tower, providing various forms of communication such as broadband internet connections and voice services to Mount Barker residents and businesses.

History 
Mount Barker was first sighted by Captain Charles Sturt in 1830, although he thought he was looking at the previously discovered Mount Lofty. Captain Collet Barker fixed this error when he surveyed the area in 1831. Sturt named the mountain in honor of Captain Barker after he was killed days later by Aborigines.

The first Europeans to ascend the mountain, on 27 November 1837, were a six-man party comprising John Barton Hack, John Morphett, Samuel Stephens, Charles Stuart (South Australian Company's stock overseer), Thomas Davis (Hack's stockman), and John Wade (a "gentleman from Hobart Town").

A counterclaim that the first Europeans to scale the summit were Robert Cock, William Finlayson, A(dolphus) Valentine Wyatt and George Barton late in December 1837 is not credible. That is because Morphett had a letter published on 28 December 1837 in a Sydney newspaper reporting that the summit had been scaled one month earlier.

Culture 
There are numerous activities such as walking trails on the mountain.

References 

Barker